Cambozola is a cow's milk cheese that is a combination in style of a French soft-ripened triple cream cheese and Italian Gorgonzola.

History 
Cambozola was patented and industrially produced for the world market by the large German company Hofmeister-Champignon. The cheese was invented circa 1980 and is still produced by Champignon. In English-speaking countries, Cambozola is often marketed as blue brie.

It is made from a combination of Penicillium camemberti and the same blue Penicillium roqueforti mould used to make Gorgonzola, Roquefort, and Stilton. Extra cream is added to the milk, giving Cambozola a rich consistency characteristic of triple crèmes, while the edible bloomy rind is similar to that of Camembert. Cambozola is considerably milder than Gorgonzola piccante and features a smooth, creamy texture with a subdued blue flavour.

The cheese's name appears to be a portmanteau of Camembert and Gorgonzola, which is fitting, given that its flavour profile combines the moist, rich creaminess of Camembert with the sharpness of blue Gorgonzola. It also refers to Cambodunum, the Roman name of Kempten, the city where Champignon is located.

See also 

 German cuisine
 List of German cheeses
 List of cheeses

External links 

 www.cambozola.com/ website
 Hofmeister-Champignon on German Wikipedia

German cheeses
Cow's-milk cheeses
Blue cheeses